Ročov ( or Rotschau) is a market town in Louny District in the Ústí nad Labem Region of the Czech Republic. It has about 600 inhabitants.

Administrative parts
Villages of Břínkov and Úlovice are administrative parts of Ročov.

Twin towns – sister cities

Ročov is twinned with:
 Reichenbach im Vogtland, Germany

References

Populated places in Louny District
Market towns in the Czech Republic